Heinz Kühn (18 February 1912 – 12 March 1992) was a German Social Democratic Party (SPD) politician and the 5th Minister President of North Rhine-Westphalia between 8 December 1966 and 20 September 1978. He was born and died in Cologne.

External links 

 
 Biography

1912 births
1992 deaths
Presidents of the German Bundesrat
Politicians from Cologne
Members of the Landtag of North Rhine-Westphalia
Social Democratic Party of Germany politicians
People from the Rhine Province
Ministers-President of North Rhine-Westphalia
Grand Crosses 1st class of the Order of Merit of the Federal Republic of Germany